Lights Poxleitner-Bokan (born Valerie Anne Poxleitner; April 11, 1987), known mononymously as Lights (previously stylized as LIGHTS), is a Canadian musician, singer, and songwriter. She is known for singles "Drive My Soul", "February Air", "Ice", "Second Go", "Toes", "My Boots" and "Up We Go", which have charted within the top ninety on the Canadian Hot 100. Her work has earned multiple Juno Awards and Canadian Independent Music Awards.

Her debut EP Lights was released in July 2008 and achieved commercial success which enabled the release of her first full-length album, The Listening, on September 22, 2009. Her second album, Siberia, was released on October 4, 2011. Both albums have been certified gold in Canada. Lights released her third studio album, Little Machines, on September 19, 2014, which debuted on the Canadian Albums Chart at number five. Her fourth album, Skin&Earth, which featured "Giants", was released in September 2017, accompanied by a graphic novel of the same name. Lights's fifth studio album, PEP, was released on April 1, 2022. Her albums won the Juno Award for Pop Album of the Year in 2015 and 2018.

Lights has collaborated with artists including Arkells, The Beaches, Bring Me the Horizon, Deadmau5, Felix Cartal, Dear Rouge, i_o, Owl City and Sleepy Tom. Lights signed with Fueled by Ramen in 2019 and released Skin&Earth Acoustic, which included three new songs.

Early life
Lights was born as Valerie Anne Poxleitner in Timmins, Ontario, to missionary parents Virginia and Eric Poxleitner on April 11, 1987. She has one older sister, Jess. She spent her childhood in many parts of the world, including the Philippines, Jamaica, and Hanover Ontario. She was home-schooled by her mother, and was also taught guitar by her father. Lights produced her first song "Saturn's Rings" with an eight-track recorder she purchased with inheritance money from her grandmother in 2001. She moved to Toronto at the age of 18 and changed her name to Lights, a nickname derived from her surname. Although there was already a signed band named "Lights", officially changing her name allowed her to use it despite the prior claim.

Music career

2006–2007: Musical beginnings
In high school, Lights played the guitar and sang in the metal band Shovel Face and accumulated a following through her Myspace page. Lights began her music career writing for Sony/ATV Music Publishing and composed music for the CTV television series Instant Star. She and Luke McMaster are credited with composing "Perfect", sung by Alexz Johnson in the role of Jude Harrison. In 2007, she contracted with Jian Ghomeshi, who acted as her manager until late 2014.

2008–2009: Lights and The Listening
Starting in early 2008, Lights toured cities in the Great Lakes region, in both Canada and the United States. Around the same time, her song "Drive My Soul" rose to  18 on the Canadian Hot 100 chart. In late 2008, she toured the United States.

In August 2008, Lights signed a record deal with Toronto-based label Underground Operations and an American partnership deal with Warner Bros. and Doghouse Records. Her self-titled EP was released on iTunes in July and on vinyl in September. Her second single, "February Air", which had been used in a commercial for Old Navy in early 2008, was released in December and sold about 12,000 copies. She released a third single, "Ice", accompanied by a homemade video in March 2009.

The commercial success of the EP and its singles enabled Lights to release the full-length album The Listening in September 2009. She promoted the album with the August 10 release of a music video for "Saviour", the first single from the album. The single was released on September 22 in Canada. Its US release was held until October 6 while she left Underground Operations for her own record label, Lights Music Inc. Lights re-recorded "Ice" for the new album and released a new video on November 10. According to Lights, the artwork for the album cover was inspired by Watchmen, 28 Days Later, and Sailor Moon.

Lights won the 2009 Juno Award for New Artist of the Year. The Listening sold more than 80,000 copies and was certified gold in Canada. In September 2009, Lights toured with the British band Keane on their Canadian/Pacific Northwest tour.

During this period, Lights also contributed vocals to Ten Second Epic's song "Every Day" and appeared in its music video. The song appeared on the Big Shiny Tunes 14 compilation album and the music video was nominated for Best Independent Music Video at the 2010 MuchMusic Video Awards. She is also featured on the soundtrack (songs "Ben" and "Climbing") for the 2008 Canadian film One Week, starring Joshua Jackson. She was a guest vocalist on the album A Shipwreck in the Sand, released in 2009 by post-hardcore band Silverstein from Burlington, Ontario.

2010–2013: Acoustic EP, Siberia, Siberia Acoustic, and tour

From January to May, she toured with contemporary synthpop artist Owl City in Canada, the United States, and Europe. She was featured in "The Yacht Club" on Owl City's 2011 album All Things Bright and Beautiful, and appeared in their music video for "Deer in the Headlights". Lights also appeared as a special guest for pop-rock band Hedley's The Show Must Go... On The Road Tour, and with These Kids Wear Crowns.

Lights released an acoustic EP titled Acoustic in July 2010, with a special performance at the University of Waterloo, where she had received most of her inspiration for the album. Later that month, she began a six-date US tour. In September, she joined Hedley for the eight-show Ontario leg of their Canadian tour. Lights appeared as a guest vocalist on the songs "Crucify Me" and "Don't Go" of Bring Me the Horizon's 2010 album There Is a Hell Believe Me I've Seen It. There Is a Heaven Let's Keep It a Secret. and on The Secret Handshake's song "Used to be Sweet".

In October 2010, Lights released the digital single "My Boots" and began a concert tour with Jeremy Fisher. At a November show in Toronto, she was presented a trophy by the Canadian Recording Industry Association for The Listenings gold certification, having then achieved 40,000 units in sales.

At the June 2011 Utopia Music Festival, Lights performed three new songs, "Toes", "Where the Fence is Low", and "Everybody Breaks a Glass". The first of these songs was released as a single in August, to promote her second studio album, Siberia. She had signed with Last Gang Records, and concerns by label executives about her shift in style to a more gritty sound delayed the album's release to October 4 in Canada and the US, and later that month in Australia. Siberia received positive reviews and was nominated for a Juno Award for Best Pop Album of the Year. It debuted at No. 3 on the Canadian Albums Chart, and sold more than 10,000 units in its first week. Sales surpassed 40,000 and the album was certified gold in Canada on April 27, 2012. Lights said in an interview that her favorite song on Siberia was "Flux and Flow".

In March 2013, Lights released an acoustic version of "Cactus in the Valley", featuring Owl City, as a single in the UK.

Siberia Acoustic was released in April 2013, and reached No. 7 in Canada. She toured North America in support of the album, with Dear Rouge opening some dates and Lianne La Havas opening others.

2014–2016: Little Machines

In July 2014, Lights' third studio album, Little Machines, became available for pre-order on iTunes with its lead single, "Up We Go", available to download. The album was released on September 23 in the US and Canada. It debuted at No. 5 in Canada. "Running with the Boys" received radio play in early 2015 as the second official single, while "Portal" and "Same Sea" received promotional releases.

In September 2014, the music video for "Up We Go" was released. It was filmed all in one take and received more than 3.5 million views on YouTube by May 2020. In October, Lights parted ways with her long-time manager Ghomeshi.

Lights continued touring extensively in support of Little Machines into 2015. On April 8, 2016, she released the acoustic EP Midnight Machines, which included acoustic versions of six songs from Little Machines and two new songs:  "Follow You Down" and "Head Cold". Lights and her band were featured in the 2016 video game LOUD on Planet X, as character avatars and with their songs "Same Sea" and "Up We Go".

2017–present: Skin & Earth, Dead End, and Pep

In April 2017, Lights announced the forthcoming release of her fourth studio album, Skin & Earth. The album was released with a comic book series drawn and written by Lights, one song per issue, starting in July. New music was released with each edition on a monthly basis until the album was released in full. Twenty One Pilots drummer Josh Dun collaborated on the album tracks "Savage" and "Almost Had Me". The song "Giants" and its accompanying music video were released on June 23. The song peaked at No. 18 on the Billboard Adult Top 40 chart. She later released versions of the song in French, Japanese, Tagalog and Spanish. On July 14, Lights released the promotional single "Skydiving". The album was made available for pre-orders on August 11 and was released on September 22, 2017. Lights released the song "Savage" on August 11, followed by "New Fears" on September 15, 2017. The album track "Fight Club" is featured in the video game Just Dance 2018.

In January 2018, Lights launched the "We Were Here Tour" with Chase Atlantic and DCF, playing 46 shows across North America in support of the album. On February 2, Lights released the music video for her song "We Were Here". She joined Young the Giant's fall tour in October as the supporting act.

In November 2018, Lights collaborated with Deadmau5 on his track "Drama Free", which was released on his Mau5ville: Level 2 EP. In early 2019, she collaborated with Felix Cartal on the track "Love Me" and with Sleepy Tom on the track "Amateurs".

On May 12, 2019, it was announced that she had signed to Fueled by Ramen, which would release Skin&Earth Acoustic supported by a North American concert tour. The acoustic album was released on July 12 with three new songs.

On June 11, 2020, she released a seven-track instrumental synthwave album on Bandcamp titled How to Sleep When You're on Fire. Proceeds from this album would be donated to the Black Lives Matter Vancouver branch.

On July 9, 2020, Lights released the song "Dead End", alongside its music video. The song was part of a remix EP of the same name, released in collaboration with MYTH on August 7.

In 2021, Lights began releasing music under the pseudonym Lūn, a character that appeared in her Skin & Earth comic in 2017, explaining "Lūn is a musician in the Skin&Earth universe. Though she is never actually mentioned, she appears all through the comic." The EP titled haha i like it was released by Lūn in April 2021. That same month, Lights released the song "Beside Myself". In October, she released "Prodigal Daughter" as the lead single from her album Pep, released on April 1, 2022. On November 16, 2021, in support of the album, Lights announced she would begin her "Baby I'm Back Tour" starting with shows in the US throughout the month of April and May 2022. She will start the Canadian leg of the tour in February 2023.

Musical style and influence 
Lights is known for her electropop and contemporary synth-pop tunes. Her musical style has been described as electropop, electronic rock and synth-pop. Lights described her own music as an "electronic landscape of moody sunset times". The Listening was characterized as gentle indie-electronic alt-rock. Siberia was characterized by a "heavier" sound than her previous works. Allmusics review of Little Machines described it as a "mature, electro-punk affair that proved Lights had grown beyond the twee, synth-and-folk artist she started out as." Lights stated that her artistic influences were Björk, Genesis and Supertramp.

Awards and nominations

Personal life
In 2010, Lights was introduced to Beau Bokan, the lead vocalist of metalcore band Blessthefall, at a Taking Back Sunday concert in Los Angeles, and the two quickly started dating. After becoming engaged in September 2011, they were married on May 12, 2012, and Lights added "Bokan" to her last name (now stylized as Poxleitner-Bokan). They received matching tattoos to commemorate their wedding date. Lights gave birth to their first child, a daughter, on February 15, 2014.

In December 2017, Lights came out as bisexual during an interview with People magazine.

Discography

 The Listening (2009)
 Siberia (2011)
 Little Machines (2014)
 Skin & Earth (2017)
 PEP (2022)
 dEd (2023)

Books
 Skin&Earth: Volume one (2017 graphic novel)
 Skin&Earth: Volume two (2017 graphic novel)
 Skin&Earth: Volume three (2017 graphic novel)
 Skin&Earth: Volume four (2017 graphic novel)
 Skin&Earth: Volume five (2017 graphic novel)
 Skin&Earth: Volume six (2017 graphic novel)
 The Clinic: A Skin&Earth Side Story (2022)

Filmography

Music videos

References

External links

 
 

 
1987 births
Living people
Bisexual singers
Bisexual songwriters
Bisexual women
Canadian child singers
Canadian Christians
Canadian electronic musicians
Canadian women pop singers
Canadian women singer-songwriters
Canadian singer-songwriters
Canadian pop singers
Canadian people of Austrian descent
Canadian people of Colombian descent
Canadian people of German descent
Canadian people of Welsh descent
Canadian women in electronic music
Child pop musicians
Juno Award for Breakthrough Artist of the Year winners
Juno Award for Dance Recording of the Year winners
Juno Award for Pop Album of the Year winners
Keytarists
LGBT Christians
Canadian LGBT singers
Canadian LGBT songwriters
Musicians from British Columbia
Musicians from Timmins
People from Mission, British Columbia
Sire Records artists
Writers from British Columbia
Writers from Ontario
21st-century Canadian women singers
Doghouse Records artists
20th-century Canadian LGBT people
21st-century Canadian LGBT people
Fueled by Ramen artists
Mau5trap artists